The 1960 Women's Western Open was contested from June 23–26 at Beverly Country Club. It was the 31st edition of the Women's Western Open.

This event was won by Joyce Ziske on the second hole of a sudden-death playoff with Barbara Romack.

Final leaderboard

External links
Daytona Beach Morning Journal source

Women's Western Open
Golf in Chicago
Women's Western Open
Women's Western Open
Women's Western Open
Women's Western Open
Women's sports in Illinois